Mikael Håkanson (born May 31, 1974) is a Swedish former professional ice hockey player who last played with the Linköpings HC team in the Swedish Hockey League (SHL, formerly named Elitserien or SEL), the top-tier league in Sweden.

Playing career
Håkanson used to be the record holder for the amount of SHL games played, both for the number of regular season games played and the combined total number of games played including playoff games. He surpassed Roger Åkerström's combined record on September 22, 2011, when he and his Linköpings HC team played a game against Skellefteå AIK at Cloetta Center which ended 4–0 in Skellefteå's favour. It was his 912th game.

At the time of his retirement after the end of the 2011–12 season, he had played 950 SHL games, 808 of which were regular-season ones. His regular season record was beaten on September 14, 2013, when David Petrasek played his 809th regular season game. After playing another four games in the 2013–14 season, Petrasek also beat Håkanson's combined record when he had played his 951st SHL game overall.

Career statistics

Regular season and playoffs

International

References

External links 

1974 births
Living people
Djurgårdens IF Hockey players
Linköping HC players
Modo Hockey players
St. John's Maple Leafs players
Swedish ice hockey right wingers
Swedish expatriate ice hockey players in Canada
Toronto Maple Leafs draft picks